Propristiophorus is an extinct genus of sawshark that lived in the Late Cretaceous. It contains a single named species, P. tumidens, from Lebanon. Additional unnamed species have been found in Antarctica, Japan, and Madagascar. Propristiophorus was previously synonymized with Pristiophorus, but more recent authors have considered it a distinct genus.

References

Pristiophoridae
Fauna of Lebanon
Fish of Japan
Fish of Madagascar
Fish of Antarctica
Prehistoric cartilaginous fish genera